State Road 74 (NM 74) is a state highway in the US state of New Mexico. NM 74's southern terminus is at NM 68 in Ohkay Owingeh, and the northern terminus is at U.S. Route 84/U.S. Route 285 (US 84/US 285) in El Duende.

Major intersections

See also

References

074
Transportation in Rio Arriba County, New Mexico